The Grand Union Canal Race (GUCR) is an ultramarathon run from the centre of Birmingham to the centre of London along the Grand Union Canal. Competitors are required to complete the  distance within a time limit of 45 hours.  Resting for more than 40 minutes at a time is not permitted. The maximum number of competitors is 100 and is very quickly reached.

The race record is held by Dan Lawson who completed the course in 22 hours 15 minutes in May 2015.

Results

Winners

References

External links
Official web site

Ultramarathons in the United Kingdom
Marathons in the United Kingdom